The Norfolk mayoral election of 2010 took place on May 4, 2010. Voters elected the Mayor of Norfolk. It saw the reelection of incumbent mayor Paul D. Fraim.

Results

See also 
 Virginia elections, 2010

References 
 

2010 Virginia elections
2010 United States mayoral elections
2010